Ivelina Raykova (born 12 November 1971) is a Bulgarian gymnast. She competed in six events at the 1988 Summer Olympics.

References

1971 births
Living people
Bulgarian female artistic gymnasts
Olympic gymnasts of Bulgaria
Gymnasts at the 1988 Summer Olympics
People from Razgrad